Ital Reding may refer to:

People
 Ital Reding the Elder (~ – 1447), Schwyz Landammann and military leader
 Ital Reding the Younger (1410–1466), Schwyz Landammann
 Ital Reding (Landvogt) (1573–1651), Landvogt and knight banneret

Other uses
 Ital-Reding-Haus or Ital-Reding-Hofstatt, a residence in Schwyz
 Itel Reding, a character from the play Wilhelm Tell
 Itel Reding, the Unter of Bells in a double German pack of cards